Joško Battestin (14 March 1918 – 21 September 2020) was a Slovene electrical engineer, inventor, physics teacher and author of a number of books on experiments in physics, many aimed at aiding the understanding of the subject by secondary school students.

Amongst his publications is a book on graphology, expanding on the theories of Ludwig Klages that Battestin published in 2008 at the age of 91. In 1965 he won the Levstik Award for his book Mikroskop Pionir (The Pioneer Microscope). He turned 100 in March 2018. In September 2019, it was reported that Battestin, 101, lived in a care home for elderly residents. He died in Ljubljana on 21 September 2020 at the age of 102.

Selected published works

 Osnove grafologije (The Basics of Graphology), 2008 (also published in French in 2011, Les bases de la graphologie)
 Preskusi iz optike (Experiments in Optics), 2004
 Preskusi iz mehanike (Experiments in Mechanics), 1994
 Optika – osnove in meritve (Optics – the Basics and Measurements), 1991
 Fizikalni praktikum I – mehanika, zvok in valovanje (The Physics Lab I – mechanics, sound and waves), 1985
 Fizikalni praktikum II – elektrika in magnetizem (The Physics Lab II – electricity and magnetism), 1983
 Mikroskop pionir (The Pioneer Microscope), 1963

References 

1918 births
2020 deaths
Levstik Award laureates
Men centenarians
Slovenian centenarians
Slovenian inventors
Yugoslav inventors
People from Ljubljana